Joseph Petrarca may refer to:
 Joseph Petrarca Sr., member of the Pennsylvania House of Representatives, 1973–1994
 Joseph Petrarca Jr., his son, member of the Pennsylvania House of Representatives, 1995–2020